Agenda is a city in Republic County, Kansas, United States.  As of the 2020 census, the population of the city was 47.

History
Agenda (formerly Neva) was laid out in 1887 on the Chicago, Rock Island and Pacific Railroad line. The name Agenda derives from Latin meaning "what ought to be done".

The first house in Agenda was erected by Joseph Cox in 1887.  In the early 1900s, it had a money order post office with one rural delivery route, express and telegraph offices, several general stores and other business establishments, a bank, a grain elevator, and in 1910 reported a population of 200.

The post office in Agenda was discontinued in 1998.

Geography
Agenda is located at  (39.708897, -97.432156).

Demographics

2010 census
As of the census of 2010, there were 68 people, 29 households, and 18 families living in the city. The racial makeup of the city was 97.1% White and 2.9% from two or more races.

There were 29 households, of which 24.1% had children under the age of 18 living with them, 58.6% were married couples living together, 3.4% had a female householder with no husband present, and 37.9% were non-families. 37.9% of all households were made up of individuals, and 17.2% had someone living alone who was 65 years of age or older. The average household size was 2.34 and the average family size was 3.11.

The median age in the city was 42 years. 25% of residents were under the age of 18; 4.5% were between the ages of 18 and 24; 22% were from 25 to 44; 23.5% were from 45 to 64; and 25% were 65 years of age or older. The gender makeup of the city was 51.5% male and 48.5% female.

2000 census
As of the census of 2000, there were 81 people, 38 households, and 24 families living in the city. The racial makeup of the city was 100.00% White.

There were 38 households, out of which 23.7% had children under the age of 18 living with them, 57.9% were married couples living together, 2.6% had a female householder with no husband present, and 36.8% were non-families. 36.8% of all households were made up of individuals, and 15.8% had someone living alone who was 65 years of age or older. The average household size was 2.13 and the average family size was 2.75.

In the city, the population was spread out, with 22.2% under the age of 18, 4.9% from 18 to 24, 23.5% from 25 to 44, 18.5% from 45 to 64, and 30.9% who were 65 years of age or older. The median age was 44 years. For every 100 females, there were 88.4 males. For every 100 females age 18 and over, there were 80.0 males.

The median income for a household in the city was $26,500, and the median income for a family was $39,063. Males had a median income of $31,250 versus $11,250 for females. The per capita income for the city was $13,307. There were no families and 5.9% of the population living below the poverty line, including no under eighteens and 6.1% of those over 64.

Education
The community is served by Republic County USD 109 public school district. It was formed in 2006 by the consolidation of Belleville USD 427 and Hillcrest USD 455. The Republic County High School mascot is Republic County Buffaloes.

Agenda schools were closed through school unification. The Agenda High School mascot was Huskies.

References

Further reading

External links
 Agenda - Directory of Public Officials
 Agenda city map, KDOT

Cities in Kansas
Cities in Republic County, Kansas
1887 establishments in Kansas
Populated places established in 1887